Gould Electronics Inc. was a manufacturer of electronics and batteries that branched into other fields before being partially absorbed in 1988 by Nippon Mining (now JX Holdings) and closed by them in 2014.

History
Gould was founded in 1928 and at some point was based in Chandler, Arizona.  Some time in the 1950s or beyond it became involved in the semiconductor industry, making printed circuit materials for use by electronics manufacturers. Having acquired Systems Engineering Laboratories Gould became involved in the Superminicomputer computer business.

From 1977 to the mid-1980s the company owned the Modicon brand of programmable logic controller, today owned by Schneider Electric.  This was in a phase where the company became a mini-conglomerate, with a diverse portfolio of industrial interests. In 1985, Gould, Inc. employed 21,000 worldwide and had sales of 1.4 billion, most of which came from its electrical and electronics products and components, and its defense systems.

Gould's non-defense businesses were acquired in 1988 by Nippon Mining (now JX Holdings). As part of the U.S. government approval of the 1988 deal, Nippon Mining was required to divest the Gould divisions then doing work for the Department of Defense, including the Computer Systems Division.  Later, in 1989, Encore Computer Corporation (about 250 employees) bought the computer division (about 2500 employees) from Nippon Mining.

At some point it became headquartered in Eichstetten, Germany.

Closure
In July 2014, Gould's then current corporate parent, JX Nippon Mining & Metals Corporation (a part of JX Holdings), announced that it would be closing down the company as a part of JX Nippon Metals & Mining's restructuring, involving closing down several facilities in Japan, the Philippines, and in Germany, where Gould was headquartered.  The restructuring was in response to, according to their press release about Gould's closure, "a shrinking market in Europe, high overcapacity and an ongoing erosion of prices, partly triggered by subsidized manufacturers from China and other Asian countries."

Gould is the current owner of a lead-contaminated parcel of land in Throop, Pennsylvania, which it bought in the early 1980s from the former Marjol Battery and Equipment Company.

The CGI title credits of the 1980s television show Amazing Stories was created using a Gould Powernode 9080 computer.

References

External links
 Company website (archived from the Wayback Machine)
 Company History (archived from the Wayback Machine)

1928 establishments in Arizona
2014 disestablishments in Arizona
American companies established in 1928
American companies disestablished in 2014
Companies based in Chandler, Arizona
Computer companies established in 1981
Computer companies disestablished in 2014
Defunct computer companies of the United States
Defunct computer hardware companies
Electronics companies established in 1928
Electronics companies disestablished in 2014
Superfund sites in Oregon